The 2012–13 National League 2 South was the fourth season (26th overall) of the fourth tier (south) of the English domestic rugby union competitions since the professionalised format of the second division was introduced.  The league system was 4 points for a win, 2 points for a draw and additional bonus points being awarded for scoring 4 or more tries and/or losing within 7 points of the victorious team.  In terms of promotion the league champions would go straight up into National League 1 while the runners up would have a one-game playoff against the runners up from National League 2 North (at the home ground of the club with the superior league record) for the final promotion place.

Henley Hawks, as champions, were promoted to the third tier (2013–14 National League 1) for next season, along with Worthing Raiders who finished second. Worthing beat the 2012–13 National League 2 North runners up Stourbridge 28–26 to win the annual promotion playoff.  Barking and Lydney were both relegated to National League 3 South West and National League 3 London & SE respectively with Barking winning just one game in what was a very poor season.  As well as winning the league Henley Hawks also saw a divisional record attendance at Dry Leas with 3,270 fans turning up to the last game of the season - the championship decider against Worthing Raiders which Henley won 55 - 27 to seal the title for the Oxfordshire club.

Participating teams
Twelve of the teams listed below participated in the 2011–12 National League 2 South season. Barking were relegated from National League 1 after just one season and both Bournemouth and Chinnor were promoted from National League 3 South West. Rugby Lions were on the original fixture list after winning promotion from National League 3 Midlands but during July 2012 they went into liquidation and were unable to participate in the division, leaving fifteen teams instead of the usual sixteen.

League table

Results

Round 1

Bye: Worthing Raiders

Round 2

Bye: Chinnor

Round 3

Bye: Redruth

Round 4

Bye: Hartpury College

Round 5

Bye: Dings Crusaders

Round 6

Bye: Shelford

Round 7

Bye: Henley Hawks

Round 8

Bye: Southend Saxons

Round 9

Bye: Clifton

Round 10

Bye: Taunton Titans

Round 11

Bye: Launceston

Round 12

Bye: Lydney

Round 13

Postponed.  Game to be rescheduled to 1 December 2012.
Bye: Bournemouth

Round 13 (Rescheduled Game)

Game rescheduled from 24 November 2012.

Round 14

Bye: Barking

Round 15

Bye: Canterbury

Round 16

Postponed.  Game rescheduled to 9 February 2013.

Postponed.  Game rescheduled to 9 February 2013.

Postponed.  Game rescheduled to 9 February 2013.

Postponed.  Game rescheduled to 9 February 2013.

Postponed.  Game rescheduled to 9 February 2013.
Bye: Chinnor

Round 17

Bye: Redruth

Round 18

Postponed. Game rescheduled to 23 February 2013.
Bye: Hartpury College

Round 19

Postponed.  Game rescheduled to 9 February 2013.

Postponed.  Game rescheduled to 23 February 2013.

Postponed.  Game rescheduled to 16 March 2013.

Postponed.  Game rescheduled to 23 February 2013.

Postponed.  Game rescheduled to 16 March 2013.

Postponed.  Game rescheduled to 23 February 2013.

Postponed.  Game rescheduled to 23 February 2013.
Bye: Dings Crusaders

Round 20

Postponed.  Game rescheduled to 4 May 2013.

Postponed.  Game rescheduled to 16 March 2013.

Postponed.  Game rescheduled to 4 May 2013.
Bye: Shelford

Round 21

Postponed.  Game rescheduled to 9 February 2013.
Bye: Henley Hawks

Rounds 16, 19 & 21 (Rescheduled Games)

Rescheduled from 22 December 2012.

Rescheduled from 22 December 2012.

Rescheduled from 19 January 2013.

Rescheduled from 2 February 2013.

Rescheduled from 22 December 2012.

Rescheduled from 22 December 2012.

Rescheduled from 22 December 2012.

Round 22

Bye: Southend Saxons

Rounds 18 & 19 (Rescheduled Games)

Rescheduled from 19 January 2013.

Rescheduled from 19 January 2013.

Rescheduled from 19 January 2013.

Rescheduled from 19 January 2013.

Rescheduled from 12 January 2013.

Round 23

Bye: Clifton

Round 24

Bye: Taunton Titans

Rounds 19 & 20 (Rescheduled Games)

Rescheduled from 19 January 2013.

Rescheduled from 26 February 2013.

Rescheduled from 19 January 2013.

Round 25

Postponed.  Game rescheduled to 4 May 2013.

Postponed.  Game rescheduled to 4 May 2013.

Postponed.  Game rescheduled to 4 May 2013.

Postponed.  Game rescheduled to 4 May 2013.

Postponed.  Game rescheduled to 11 May 2013.
Bye: Launceston

Round 26

Bye: Lydney

Round 27

Bye: Bournemouth

Round 28

Bye: Barking

Round 29

Bye: Canterbury

Round 30

Bye: Worthing Raiders

Rounds 20 & 25 (Rescheduled Games)

Rescheduled from 26 January 2013.

Rescheduled from 23 March 2013.

Rescheduled from 23 March 2013.

Rescheduled from 23 March 2013.

Rescheduled from 23 March 2013.

Rescheduled from 26 January 2013.

Round 25 (Rescheduled Game)

Rescheduled from 23 March 2013.

Promotion play–off
Each season, the runners–up in the National League 2 South and National League 2 North participate in a play–off for promotion into National League 1. The team with the best playing record, in this case northern runners up Stourbridge, would gain the home advantage with southern runners up Worthing Raiders having to travel up to the Midlands for the game.

Total Season Attendances

Individual statistics 

 Note that points scorers includes tries as well as conversions, penalties and drop goals.  Does not include North - South playoff game.

Top Points Scorers

Top Try Scorers

Season records

Team
Largest home win — 78 pts
74 - 0 Taunton Titans at home to Barking on 17 November 2012
Largest away win — 83 pts
85 - 3 Henley Hawks away to Barking on 27 October 2012
Most points scored — 85 pts
85 - 3 Henley Hawks away to Barking on 27 October 2012
Most tries in a match — 13
Henley Hawks away to Barking on 27 October 2012
Most conversions in a match — 10
Henley Hawks away to Barking on 27 October 2012
Most penalties in a match — 7 (x2)
Hartpury College away to Dings Crusaders on 17 November 2012
Dings Crusaders away to Lydney on 1 December 2012
Most drop goals in a match — 2 (x2)
Launceston away to Hartpury College on 5 January 2013
Southend Saxons away to Worthing Raiders on 30 March 2013

Player
Most points in a match — 29
 Kieron Lewitt for Launceston at home to Barking on 6 April 2013
Most tries in a match — 5
 Gareth Evans for Hartpury College at home to Clifton on 27 April 2013
Most conversions in a match — 10
 James Combden for Henley Hawks away to Barking on 27 October 2012
Most penalties in a match — 7 (x2)
 Luke Cozens for Hartpury College away to Dings Crusaders on 17 November 2012
 Danial Trigg for Dings Crusaders away to Lydney on 1 December 2012
Most drop goals in a match — 2 (x2)
 Jake Murphy for Launceston away to Hartpury College on 5 January 2013
 Robert Kirby for Southend Saxons away to Worthing Raiders on 30 March 2013

Attendances
Highest — 3,270   
Henley Hawks at home against Worthing Raiders on 4 May 2013
Lowest — 67  
Barking at home against Taunton Titans on 30 March 20131
Highest Average Attendance — 724
Redruth
Lowest Average Attendance — 102
Barking

See also
 English rugby union system
 Rugby union in England

References

External links
 NCA Rugby

2012-13
2012–13 in English rugby union leagues